Einar Strøm may refer to:

 Einar Strøm (gymnast) (1885–1964), Norwegian gymnast
 Einar Strøm (politician) (born 1945), Norwegian politician